Harold Walter Hanson (August 10, 1905 – September 29, 1977) was an American football player. He played college football for Minnesota and in the National Football League (NFL) as a guard for the Frankford Yellow Jackets (1928-1930) and Minneapolis Red Jackets (1930). He appeared in 51 NFL games, 44 as a starter.

References

1905 births
1977 deaths
Minnesota Golden Gophers football players
Frankford Yellow Jackets players
Minneapolis Red Jackets players
Players of American football from Minnesota
American football guards
People from McLeod County, Minnesota